The Griot is a 2021 Nigerian drama film directed by Adeoluwa Owu and produced by Goodness Emmanuel. The film stars Lateef Adedimeji, Funso Adeolu, Goodness Emmanuel, Imoh Eboh, Sharon Jatto. It was released on 9 November 2021 and premiered on Netflix in 2022.

Plot 
The film's theme revolves around a shy but skilled storyteller who has a talent for storytelling, but his best friend tries to take credit for his tales and win the heart of the woman they both love.

Cast 

 Abimbola Adebajo as Queen
 Lateef Adedimeji as Lakunle
 Yewande Adekoya as Sunbo
 Jare Adeniregun as Odejinmi
 Funso Adeolu as Oba Adejare
 Adekunle Adeosun as Patron
 Fatimo Adio as Olori
 Kunle Afod as Baba
 Angela Babarinsa as Iyemojo
 Imoh Eboh as Romoke
 Goodness Emmanuel as Tiwa
 Temilolu Fosudo as Sanmi

References

External links 

 
 

English-language Nigerian films
Nigerian drama films
2021 films
2021 drama films
2010s English-language films